Tubocurarine (also known as d-tubocurarine or DTC) is a toxic alkaloid historically known for its use as an arrow poison. In the mid-1900s, it was used in conjunction with an anesthetic to provide skeletal muscle relaxation during surgery or mechanical ventilation. It is now rarely used as an adjunct for clinical anesthesia because safer alternatives, such as cisatracurium and rocuronium, are available.

History

Tubocurarine is a naturally occurring mono-quaternary alkaloid obtained from the bark of the Menispermaceous South American plant Chondrodendron tomentosum, a climbing vine known to the European world since the Spanish conquest of South America. Curare had been used as a source of arrow poison by South American natives to hunt animals, and they were able to eat the animals' contaminated flesh subsequently without any adverse effects because tubocurarine cannot easily cross mucous membranes. Thus, tubocurarine is effective only if given parenterally, as demonstrated by Bernard, who also showed that the site of its action was at the neuromuscular junction. Virchow and Munter confirmed the paralyzing action was limited to voluntary muscles.

Etymology

The word curare comes from the South American Native name for the arrow poison, ourare. Presumably, the initial syllable was pronounced with a heavy glottal stop. Tubocurarine is so-called because some of the plant extracts designated curare were stored, and subsequently shipped to Europe, in bamboo tubes. Likewise, curare stored in calabash containers was called calabash curare, although this was usually an extract not of Chondrodendron, but of the Strychnos species S. toxifera, containing a different alkaloid, namely toxiferine. Pot curare was generally a mixture of extracts from various genera in the families Menispermaceae and Strychnaceae. The tripartite classification into "tube", "calabash", and "pot" curares early became untenable, due to inconsistencies in the use of the different types of vessels and the complexities of the dart poison recipes themselves.

Use in anesthesia

Griffith and Johnson are credited with pioneering the formal clinical introduction of tubocurarine as an adjunct to anesthetic practice on 23 January 1942, at the Montreal Homeopathic Hospital. In this sense, tubocurarine is the prototypical adjunctive neuromuscular non-depolarizing agent. However, others before Griffith and Johnson had attempted use of tubocurarine in several situations: some under controlled study conditions while others not quite controlled and remained unpublished. Regardless, all in all some 30,000 patients had been given tubocurarine by 1941, although it was Griffith and Johnson's 1942 publication that provided the impetus to the standard use of neuromuscular blocking agents in clinical anesthetic practice – a revolution that rapidly metamorphosized into the standard practice of "balanced" anesthesia: the triad of barbiturate hypnosis, light inhalational anesthesia and muscle relaxation. The technique as described by Gray and Halton was widely known as the "Liverpool technique", and became the standard anesthetic technique in England in the 1950s and 1960s for patients of all ages and physical status. Present clinical anesthetic practice still employs the central principle of balanced anesthesia though with some differences to accommodate subsequent technological advances and introductions of new and better gaseous anesthetic, hypnotic and neuromuscular blocking agents, and tracheal intubation, as well as monitoring techniques that were nonexistent in the day of Gray and Halton: pulse oximetry, capnography, peripheral nerve stimulation, noninvasive blood pressure monitoring, etc.

Chemical properties

Structurally, tubocurarine is a benzylisoquinoline derivative. For many years, its structure, when first elucidated in 1948, was incorrectly thought to be bis-quaternary: in other words, it was thought to be an N,N-dimethylated alkaloid. In 1970, the correct structure was finally established, showing one of the two nitrogens to be tertiary, actually a mono-N-methylated alkaloid.

Biosynthesis
Tubocurarine biosynthesis involves a radical coupling of the two enantiomers of N-methylcoclaurine. (R) and (S)-N-methylcoclaurine come from a Mannich-like reaction between dopamine and 4-hydroxyphenylacetaldehyde, facilitated by norcoclaurine synthase (NCS). Both dopamine and 4-hydroxyphenylacetaldehyde originate from L-tyrosine. Methylation of the amine and hydroxyl substituents are facilitated by S-adenosyl methionine (SAM). One methyl group is present on each nitrogen atom prior to the radical coupling. The additional methyl group is transferred to form tubocurarine, with its single quaternary N,N-dimethylamino group.

Biological effects

Without intervention, acetylcholine (ACh) in the peripheral nervous system activates skeletal muscles. Acetylcholine is produced in the body of the neuron by choline acetyltransferase and transported down the axon to the synaptic gap. Tubocurarine chloride acts as an antagonist for the  nicotinic acetylcholine receptor (nAChr), meaning it blocks the receptor site from ACh. This may be due to the quaternary amino structural motif found on both molecules.

Clinical pharmacology
Unna et al. reported the effects of tubocurarine on humans:

Tubocurarine has a time of onset of around 5 minutes which is relatively slow among neuromuscular-blocking drugs, and has a duration of action of 60 to 120 minutes. It also causes histamine release, now a recognized hallmark of the tetrahydroisioquinolinium class of neuromuscular blocking agents. Histamine release is associated with bronchospasms, hypotension, and salivary secretions, making it dangerous for asthmatics, children, and those who are pregnant or lactating. However, the main disadvantage in the use of tubocurarine is its significant ganglion-blocking effect, that manifests as hypotension, in many patients; this constitutes a relative contraindication to its use in patients with myocardial ischaemia.

Because of the shortcomings of tubocurare, much research effort was undertaken soon after its clinical introduction to find a suitable replacement. The efforts unleashed a multitude of compounds borne from structure-activity relations developed from the tubocurare molecule. Some key compounds that have seen clinical use are identified in the muscle relaxants template box below. Of the many tried as replacements, only a few enjoyed as much popularity as tubocurarine: pancuronium, vecuronium, rocuronium, atracurium, and cisatracurium. Succinylcholine is a widely used muscle relaxant drug which acts by activating, instead of blocking, the ACh receptor.

The potassium channel blocker tetraethylammonium (TEA) has been shown to reverse the effects of tubocurarine. It is thought to do so by increasing ACh release, which counteracts the antagonistic effects of tubocurarine on the ACh receptor.

Use as spider bite treatment
Spiders of the genus Latrodectus have α-latrotoxin in their venom. The most well known spider in this genus is the black widow spider. α-latrotoxin causes the release of neurotransmitters into the synaptic gap, including acetylcholine. Bites are usually not fatal, but do cause a significant amount of pain in addition to muscle spasms. The venom is the most damaging to nerve endings, but the introduction of d-tubocurarine chloride blocks the nAChr, alleviating pain and muscle spasms while an antivenom can be administered.

Toxicology
An individual administered tubocurarine chloride will be unable to move any voluntary muscles, including the diaphragm. A large enough dose will therefore result in death from respiratory failure unless artificial ventilation is initiated. The LD50 for mice and rabbits are 0.13 mg/kg and 0.146 mg/kg intravenously, respectively. It releases histamine and causes hypotension.

References

Benzylisoquinoline alkaloids
Cyclophanes
Macrocycles
Muscle relaxants
Neuromuscular blockers
Neurotoxins
Nicotinic antagonists
Norsalsolinol ethers
Phenols
Quaternary ammonium compounds
Resorcinol ethers